Holton Maddux Ahlers (born November 10, 1999) is an American football quarterback. He plays college football for East Carolina. Ahlers attended and played football for D.H. Conley High School in Greenville, North Carolina. 

Ahlers is the career leader in passing yards, total offensive yards, passing touchdowns, touchdowns responsible for, completions, pass attempts, and rushing touchdowns by a quarterback in East Carolina history.

Early life and high school career 
Ahlers was born on November 10, 1999, in Greenville, North Carolina. He attended and played football, baseball, and basketball for D.H. Conley High School in Greenville. He was a four-year starter and a team captain as he led D.H. Conley to four straight playoff appearances and three conference titles. During his time as a starter he was one of North Carolina High School Athletic Association's (NCHSAA) most prolific passers as he finished as the third all-time leader in passing yards with 11,198. He also finished second all-time in total offensive yards with 14,784. While also being third all-time in passing yards, he was also third in touchdowns responsible for with 201, passing touchdowns with 145 and fifth and sixth respectively in pass completions with 670 and pass attempts with 1,157. He was a three-time First-Team All-Conference selection, two-time Conference Player of the Year, two-time Greenville Daily Reflector's First-Team All-Conference, and received the Raleigh News & Observer All-Metro Quarterback honors.

As a sophomore in 2015, Ahlers threw for 2,457 yards and ran for 1,142 and was named team MVP and earned All-County honors. He accounted for 42 total touchdowns.

As a junior in 2016, Ahlers was an Associated Press All-State choice and a 252 ESPN Radio Player of the Year as he gained 5,414 total yards and 66 total touchdowns. Through the air he threw for 51 touchdowns while only throwing nine interceptions. He also rushed for 911 yards and an additional fifteen touchdowns. Against C.B. Aycock in a 83–68 victory he set the single-game total offense record of 618 yards, beating the previous record that was set a week prior against J.H. Rose in a 67–77 loss.

As a senior in 2017, Ahlers and the Vikings finished 11–2 and a 3A/4A conference title, finishing 6–0 in conference play, and an appearance in the state playoffs. That season he earned the honors as Raleigh News & Observer Player of the Year and Greenville Daily Reflector's First-Team All-State honors. He accounted for 75 total touchdowns, which was good enough for second all-time in a season. He finished the season going 223 of 358 passing for 3,763 yards and 61 passing touchdowns to only four interceptions. He added 933 rushing yards and fourteen touchdowns on the ground as well. Out of thirteen games, he surpassed the 300-yard mark in six, including a season-high 464 against West Craven. After the season he was also named as the Pitt County Post Offensive Player of the Year and received an invite to the Shrine Bowl where he won most valuable player.

Recruiting 
Ahlers was a consensus three-star recruit among the major recruiting databases. He was recruited by many colleges including: Colorado State, Minnesota, NC State, and West Virginia before on January 30, 2017 he committed to East Carolina.

Statistics

College career

2018 

In 2018, Ahlers played in ten games and started five. He did not play against North Carolina A&T in the season opener, but made his college football debut in week two against North Carolina. He would attempt one pass which was incomplete but was a large contributor on the ground. He ran eight times for 36 yards and two touchdowns, the first of which coming in the second quarter to give the Pirates the lead of the Tar Heels. His second came early in the fourth as the game was already out of reach for North Carolina, East Carolina went on to win 41–19. The team's game against Virginia Tech was canceled and he played sparingly against South Florida, Old Dominion, and Temple. Against Houston, after starter Reid Herring and backup Kingsley Ifedi were benched due to poor play, Ahlers came in while down 35–6 early in the fourth. Despite being down big against D'Eriq King, Ahlers led East Carolina to two scoring drives, both of which touchdowns by him, as he finished the game eleven of eighteen for 137 yards and a touchdown alongside being the team's leading rusher with 45 yards on five attempts and a touchdown. He would earn his first career start against UCF the next week. Despite losing 10–37, he would play the entire game going 29 of 53 for 406 yards and a touchdown and interceptions. He started the following four weeks against Memphis, Tulane, UConn, and Cincinnati. Against Memphis, even though he lost 41–59, Ahlers had three touchdown passes and scored the most points of the season to that point since week two against North Carolina. After losing to Tulane 18–24 the next week, he would lead the team to its third and final win on the season against UConn. Against the Huskies he went 22 of 31 for 242 yards and a career-high four touchdowns. He added 130 rushing yards and another touchdown on twelve carries. He finished the year off with a 6–56 loss to Cincinnati in which he left the game early with an injury to his knee and non-throwing hand which caused him to also miss the final game of the season against NC State.

2019 

In 2019, Ahlers started all twelve games for the pirates after winning the starting job over the offseason. He finished the season with 3,387 yards and 21 touchdowns. In the season-opener against NC State he would finish the game 22 of 39 for 168 yards and an interception before being pulled in favor of Reid late in the game. In the team's home-opener against Gardner–Webb the next week they would get their first win on the season. Ahlers went eighteen of 29 for 195 yards and one interception and touchdown. They would win 48–9 as he also tallied two rushing touchdowns and 85 yards on the ground. He would struggle against Navy in a 10–42 loss before winning back-to-back against William & Mary and Old Dominion. They would go on to lose to Temple, UCF, South Florida, Cincinnati, and SMU before bouncing back against UConn. In the game against Cincinnati he set a East Carolina record for passing yards and total yards in a game with 535 and 556 respectively. Despite also throwing for four touchdowns, a late surge by Desmond Ridder and eighteen points in the fourth quarter by the Bearcats caused the Pirates to fall 43–46. His 535 yards passing is only third to Anthony Gordon's record of 606 and 570. The next week against SMU he once again set an East Carolina record as he threw for six touchdowns. On top of throwing for a record six scores he also completed 32 of 42 passes for 498 yards while scoring 51 total points. Even with his offensive excellence it was not good enough to best Shane Buechele who had five touchdown passes as they would lost 51–59 against the Mustangs. East Carolina won their final and fourth game on the season the following week against UConn. Against the Huskies he went 34 for fifty for 374 yards and one touchdown alongside two interceptions. On the ground he also tallied 22 yards and a touchdown to help lead the Pirates to a 31–24 win. The team could not continue the momentum as they dropped the season finale against Tulsa 24–49.

2020 

In 2020, due to COVID-19 the team's first three games against Marshall, South Carolina, and Norfolk State were all canceled. Ahler started eight of nine games missing only the game against Navy due to COVID-19 protocol. On the season he finished with 1,921 yards and eighteen touchdowns. He was named to the Manning Award and Wuerffel Trophy watch lists. By Athlon Sports he was a Fourth-Team Preseason All-AAC selection. The team's home, and season, opener against No. 13 UCF was a 28–51 loss. Against the Knights he finished fourteen of 29 for 215 yards and three touchdowns, but the team's defense could not stop Dillon Gabriel as he threw for four touchdowns and over 400 yards. After losing to Georgia State 29–49, the team bounced back against South Florida. In that game he threw for 222 yards on seventeen completions in 26 attempts and three touchdowns. The team would lose four-straight against Navy, the game in which Ahlers missed due to COVID-19, Tulsa, Tulane, and Cincinnati. In his return from COVID-19 he threw for 330 yards on 38 completions in fifty attempts alongside three touchdowns as the team narrowly lost 30–34. In the second-to-last game of the season against Temple, Ahlers led the Pirates past Temple with two touchdowns through the air while tallying another on the ground. To finish off the season he had one of his best performances of the season against SMU. He went twenty of 29 for 298 yards and four touchdowns. The team outscored the Mustangs 52–38 in the winning effort to finish the season with three wins.

2021 

In 2021, Ahlers started all twelve games, finishing the season with eighteen touchdowns and 3,126 passing yards. He was named to the Third-Team Preseason All-AAC pick by Phil Steele's College Football Preview and a Fourth-Team Preseason All-AAC selection once again by Athlon Sports. During the season he became one of four active FBS quarterbacks with 10,000 career passing yards and 1,000 career rushing yards. He was named to the 2021 NFLPA Collegiate Bowl Big Board watch list while also being on the midseason watch list for the Davey O'Brien Award. Ahlers started the season off going 22 of 40 for 295 yards, two touchdowns, and an interception against Appalachian State as they lost 19–33 to the Mountaineers. After going up 14–0 against South Carolina, a 65-yard pick 6 thrown by Ahlers brought the Gamecocks back into the game with a minute left in the first half. In the second half the offense could only manage a field goal which lead to the 17–20 loss. In the rivalry game against Marshall, East Carolina got their first win of the season. He threw for 368 yards and two touchdowns while also scoring another touchdown with his legs. The Pirates bested the Thundering Herd 42–38. After winning back-to-back against Charleston Southern and a 52-point performance against Tulane, East Carolina dropped back-to-back games against UCF and Houston. Against Houston, Ahlers and the Cougars were tied heading into overtime. In overtime, Houston scored first and East Carolina would get the opportunity to match, but a fumble caused on the second offensive play for the Pirates caused them to lose in heart-breaking fashion. The team would then win four-straight games. Against South Florida, Ahlers threw for four touchdowns and against Navy he threw three before struggling against Memphis despite the win with two interceptions. He would bounce back against Temple and have another three touchdown performance. He would be bested once again by Ridder and Cincinnati as they lost their last regular season game 13–35. The team finished the season with a 7–5 record, their best with Ahlers under center, and earned a bid in the Military Bowl against Boston College. The game was ultimately canceled due to COVID-19.

2022 

In 2022, Ahlers started all thirteen games leading the Pirates to a career-best eight wins and their first bowl win since 2014. Prior to the season he was once again named to the Wuerffel Trophy watch list, but was also on the watch list for the Golden Arm Award, Davey O'Brien Award, and the Reese's Senior Bowl. For the third-straight year he was named Fourth-Team Preseason All-AAC team by Athlon Sports. He finished his career as the lone active quarterback with 13,000 career passing yards. In the season-opener, Ahlers could not get over the hump of No. 13 NC State as he threw two interceptions and two touchdowns in a narrow 20–21 loss. With five seconds left, East Carolina kicker Owen Daffer missed a would-be game winner from 41 yards. He went 25 of 39 for 270 yards and two touchdowns in a win against Old Dominion, and the next week he was a surgical seventeen of twenty for 263 yards and three touchdowns in a win over Campbell. Against Navy, both teams were tied at seventeen going into overtime and East Carolina started with the ball first. Ahlers led the Pirates close enough for a 26 yard field goal to put them up 20–17. Navy would respond with a field goal of their own on back-to-back overtime possessions to go up 20–23. After three-straight incompletions by Ahlers, East Carolina kicker Daffer misses another game-winning kick, this time from 37 yards. The team would bounce back against South Florida as he threw for a tied career-high and team-record six touchdowns. Following the record-tying performance against the Bulls he struggled against Tulane and lost 9–24. In fourth overtime against Memphis, a failed two-point attempt by Seth Henigan caused the Pirates to win 47–45. Ahlers led East Carolina past UCF and BYU before being stumped by Cincinnati and Houston. Despite a five touchdown performance by Temple quarterback E.J. Warner, Ahlers' three touchdown passes, including the game winning strike with a minute left, were good enough to etch past the Owls 49–46. East Carolina finished the regular season 7–5 and earned a bid in the Birmingham Bowl against Coastal Carolina. Against the Chanticleers, and in Ahlers final career game, he threw for 300 yards on 26 completions in 38 attempts alongside five touchdowns. His five passing touchdowns was a Birmingham Bowl record, but as he tallied on another touchdown on the ground, his total of six touchdowns were also a bowl record. The Pirates won 53–29.

Following the 2022 season, Ahlers was named to the NFLPA Collegiate Bowl American Team. During the game he went nine of twelve for 189 yards and a touchdown. His performance was good enough for a 19–17 win over the National Team and the honors of the game's MVP. He was also invited to the 2023 Hula Bowl where he played for Team Kai. He would throw a touchdown to Michael Ezeike to put Team Kai up 10–3 and the team held onto the lead to win 16–13. Ahlers performance won him the game's MVP.

Statistics

East Carolina records 
Career records:

 Passing yards: 13,933
 Total offensive yards: 15,373
 Passing touchdowns: 97
 Touchdowns responsible for: 122
 Completions: 1,127
 Pass attempts: 1,857
 Rushing touchdowns by a quarterback: 25

Single season records:

 Passing efficiency rating: 151.1 (2022)

Single game records:

 Passing yards: 535 (2019 vs. Cincinnati)
 Touchdown passes: 6 (2019 vs. SMU; 2022 vs. South Florida)
 Total yards: 556 (2019 vs. Cincinnati)

American Athletic Conference records 
Career records:

 Total plays: 2,326
 Total offensive yards: 15,373
 Completions: 1,127
 Pass attempts: 1,857
 Passing yards: 13,933
 Touchdowns responsible for: 122

Birmingham Bowl records:

 Touchdown passes: 5 (2022)
 Touchdowns responsible for: 6 (2022)

Personal life 
Ahlers is the founder and co-founder of Built When Broken, a Christian-based apparel company which was founded following the unexpected passing of his friend in 2017.

See also 

 NCAA Division I FBS passing leaders

References

External links 

 East Carolina Pirates bio

Living people
East Carolina Pirates football players
1999 births
People from Greenville, North Carolina
American football quarterbacks
Christians from North Carolina
Sportspeople from Greenville, North Carolina
Players of American football from North Carolina